The infraclassis Carinacea includes most living species of regular sea urchin, and fossil forms going back as far as the Triassic.

Taxonomy 
List of orders according to World Register of Marine Species : 
 Super-order Calycina
 Order Phymosomatoida†
 Order Salenioida
 Super-order Echinacea
 Order Arbacioida (Gregory, 1900)
 Order Camarodonta (Jackson, 1912)
 Order Stomopneustoida (Kroh & Smith, 2010)
 Family Glyphopneustidae  Smith & Wright, 1993†
 Family Hemicidaridae Wright, 1857†
 Family Orthopsidae Duncan, 1889†
 Family Pseudodiadematidae Pomel, 1883†

Bibliography 
 Andreas Kroh et Andrew B. Smith, « The phylogeny and classification of post-Palaeozoic echinoids », Journal of Systematic Palaeontology, vol. 8, no 2, 2010, p. 147-212

Echinoidea